Paulo Mwaselle (born 27 March 1969) is a Tanzanian boxer. He competed in the men's light heavyweight event at the 1992 Summer Olympics.

References

1969 births
Living people
Tanzanian male boxers
Olympic boxers of Tanzania
Boxers at the 1992 Summer Olympics
Place of birth missing (living people)
Light-heavyweight boxers